Sailors is a 1964 Swedish film directed by Arne Mattsson and starring Dirch Passer.

Cast
 Dirch Passer - Sam
 Anita Lindblom - Carmen
 Åke Söderblom - Nappe von Lohring
 Nils Hallberg - Nitouche
 Elisabeth Odén - Eva
 Per Asplin - Bob
 Siv Ericks - Mrs. Plunkett
 Grynet Molvig - Pia
 Carl-Axel Elfving - Fifi
 Arve Opsahl - Månsson
 Lillevi Bergman - Mia
 Tomas Bolme - Big Man / as Bolme, Thomas
 Eric Brage - Ship's officer
 Curt Ericson - Olsson
 Sven Holmberg - Second man with draft-order in El Bajo
 Olof Huddén - Swahn
 Nils Kihlberg - Söderman
 Lennart Lindberg - Berg
 Gustaf Lövås - First man with draft-order in Stockholm and El Bajo
 Marianne Mohaupt - Fia
 Cence Sulevska - Ballet dancer
 Hans Wallbom - Sören
 Birger Åsander - Second man with draft-order in Stockholm (uncredited)
 Carl-Gustaf Lindstedt - Ship's Doctor (uncredited)

External links

1964 films
1960s Swedish-language films
Films directed by Arne Mattsson
1960s Swedish films